Jonathan Dow (born 23 March 1965) is a British actor and voiceover artist. He joined the National Youth Theatre at the age of 14, and after finishing his A levels he trained at the Guildhall Drama School. His first big television role was as Under Secretary Tim in No Job for a Lady (ITV, 1990) with Penelope Keith.

He has also appeared as P.C. Stringer in The Bill (ITV, 1990–1993) and Dr. James Mortimer in the Jed Mercurio series Cardiac Arrest (BBC, 1994–1996). He also appeared in one episode of Sooty & Co. as a police officer.

In 2018, Dow recorded a two-part interview for The Bill Podcast to discuss his life and career. In 2019, Dow appeared in the fifth series of Jed Mercurio's acclaimed drama series "Line of Duty"

Personal life
Dow lives in London and has three sons, Evan Dow, Lorcan Dow and Rory Dow.

External links 
 

English male television actors
People educated at King's School, Worcester
1965 births
Living people
National Youth Theatre members